Joseph Walter Whyte (born April 18, 1961) is an American actor, and artist.

Career
Whyte started working at Walt Disney Animation Studios in 1995, and worked as a modeler and voiceover artist there until 2010. He is best known for voicing Chris Redfield in Resident Evil: The Remake, but has also had voices in many Disney animated films, including Tarzan, Home on the Range, Chicken Little, Meet the Robinsons and Prep and Landing, among others.

Filmography

Film

Television

Video games

Production credits

References

External links
 

Living people
American male film actors
American male television actors
American male video game actors
American male voice actors
20th-century American male actors
21st-century American male actors
1961 births